Stefan Uteß (born 31 October 1974 in Demmin, Mecklenburg-Vorpommern) is a German sprint canoer who competed in the late 1990s and early 2000s. He won a bronze medal in the C-2 1000 m event at the 2000 Summer Olympics in Sydney with Lars Kober.

References
DatabaseOlympics.com profile
Sports-reference.com profile

1974 births
Living people
People from Demmin
Canoeists at the 2000 Summer Olympics
German male canoeists
Olympic canoeists of Germany
Olympic bronze medalists for Germany
Olympic medalists in canoeing
Medalists at the 2000 Summer Olympics
Sportspeople from Mecklenburg-Western Pomerania